The Shenandoah Mountain salamander (Plethodon virginia) is a species of salamander in the family Plethodontidae native to the Eastern United States.

Distribution
The species is endemic to the Shenandoah Mountains range of the Appalachian Mountains, in eastern West Virginia and adjacent northwestern Virginia.

It is an IUCN Red List Near Threatened species, endangered by habitat loss.

References

Plethodon
Salamander, Shenandoah Mountain
Ecology of the Appalachian Mountains
Salamander, Shenandoah Mountain
Natural history of Virginia
Natural history of West Virginia
Taxonomy articles created by Polbot
Amphibians described in 1999